Tallahassee 7000 is a syndicated 1961 American TV series starring Walter Matthau as Special Agent Lex Rogers of the Florida Sheriffs Bureau. It consisted of 26 episodes of 30 minutes each. It was executive produced by Herbert Leonard.

The bureau (the only one of its kind in the United States) helped sheriffs in Florida's 67 counties. The show's title was the phone number of the bureau. Rogers had his headquarters in Miami Beach, and episodes focused on his investigations.

The program was filmed on location in Florida and was made directly for syndication by  Screen Gems. Herbert Leonard was executive producer. Matthau disliked television and says he took the job "only for the minor inconvenience of making a living."

Matthau's biographers called it "another Matthau career nadir."

References

External links

Review of pilot episode at Variety
1961 American television series debuts
1961 American television series endings
Television shows set in Florida